Dominique Wavre, is a Swiss professional yachtsman, born on 4 July 1955 in Geneva, Switzerland. Having sailed over 360,000 nautical miles, Dominique now ranks among the most experienced ocean sailors

Biography
Son of tennis player Alice Charbonnier he started on the courts before discovering sailing at the age of 13. He began sailing on Lake Geneva but continued his studies and became an art teacher. Then he sailed with Pierre Fehlmann in 1981 in the Whitbread onboard Disc d'Or III. Since then, he'll keep accumulating miles. He met his partner Michèle Paret during the 1989-90 Whitebread as she was sailing with Tracy Edwards onboard Maiden

Race result highlights

References

External links 
 Official website 
 Official Racing Facebook 
 Official Cruising Facebook

1955 births
Living people
Sportspeople from Geneva
Swiss male sailors (sport)
Volvo Ocean Race sailors
IMOCA 60 class sailors
Vendée Globe finishers
2000 Vendee Globe sailors
2004 Vendee Globe sailors
2008 Vendee Globe sailors
2012 Vendee Globe sailors
Swiss Vendee Globe sailors
Single-handed circumnavigating sailors
21st-century Swiss people